Ichneumonella is a genus of moths in the family Sesiidae.

Species
Ichneumonella hyaloptera Gorbunov & Arita, 2005
Ichneumonella viridiflava Gorbunov & Arita, 2005

References

Sesiidae